Maksime Kvilitaia (born September 17, 1985) is a Georgian professional football goalkeeper who plays for Shahin Bushehr in the Persian Gulf Pro League.

References

1985 births
Living people
Footballers from Georgia (country)
Association football goalkeepers
Expatriate footballers from Georgia (country)
Expatriate sportspeople from Georgia (country) in Iran
Expatriate footballers in Iran
Shahin Bushehr F.C. players
FC Spartaki Tbilisi players
FC Zugdidi players
FC Chikhura Sachkhere players
FC Spartaki Tskhinvali players
FC Torpedo Kutaisi players
Persian Gulf Pro League players